Oakhill College is a fee-paying independent Roman Catholic comprehensive co-educational secondary day school, located in Castle Hill, a suburb in the Hills District of the Greater Western region of Sydney, New South Wales, Australia.

Founded in 1936, the College is run by the De La Salle Brothers in the tradition of Saint Jean-Baptiste de La Salle, and currently caters for approximately 1,800 students from Years 7 to 12.

Oakhill College is a member of the Independent Schools Association.

History
The De La Salle Brothers purchased the Oakhill property in 1932. The College commenced in August 1936 with four male students, increasing to 30 in 1937 when there were 10 day and 20 boarding students. The College served the then rural area of "The Hills", and grew slowly until in 1953, its enrolment reached 100.

In 1974 the decision was taken to phase out the boarding school and, in 1976 Oakhill College became a co-educational senior school. 
In the year 2006, the 100th year of the Brothers in Australia was celebrated with a mass at St Mary's Cathedral.

The property was initially used as a training college for brothers; the school came later. The training college for brothers evolved into a training college for Catholic lay teachers, which was then merged into the Australian Catholic University in the 1980s, which then became the Castle Hill campus of the ACU.  Finally, in the 1990s, the ACU decided to consolidate their campuses in Sydney, and abandoned their Castle Hill facility, which then reverted to the De La Salle brothers.  Since then, the original training college has been extensively renovated, named the De La Salle Building and forms part of the College.

Oakhill College is governed by a Board of Directors.

Facilities
The Mackillop Commons is the newest addition to the College campus. The Centenary Sports Centre was built during the course of 2006, and was opened in late November 2006. It has a 25-metre pool, classrooms, cemetery, Chapel, tennis courts, Drama Theatre, green room, agriculture centre, farm, hall, kitchen, canteen, Library, Uniform Shop and a gym. The main part of the centre is a double basketball court, which is also used for College assemblies and connects to the Benildus Hall.

Co-curricular
The College offers a large range of co-curricular activities, such as: Show Team, Debating, Public Speaking, Coding Club, Chess Club, Basketball, Rugby, Rugby 7s, Football, Tennis, Touch Football, Cricket, Hockey, Athletics, Netball, Swimming, Drama Club, Choirs, Music Ensembles, Duke of Edinburgh, Art Club, Science Club and Mathematics Enrichment. Oakhill College conducts a major musical every two years, and a junior musical every alternate year, open to any student within the required year groups. Additionally, Year 10 and 12 respectively stage plays in the later part of the school year, with the cast and crew composed entirely of drama students, whose performance is graded and forms part of their assessment mark. Past productions have included:

Senior Musicals (Open to whole College) Every ‘even’ year:

 1996 - Chess
 2002 - Les Misérables
 2004 - Hooked
 2006 - Jesus Christ Superstar
 2008 - All Shook Up
 2010 - Paris
 2012 - Cats
 2014 - Miss Saigon
 2016 - Starlight Express
 2018 - Strictly Ballroom
 2020 - Urinetown: The Musical
 2022 - Les Misérables 

Junior Musicals (Years 7-9) - Every ‘odd’ year:

 2011 - Smike
 2013 - Tin Pan Ali
 2015 - Bats
 2017 - Boys Own McBeth
 2019 - Oliver!
 2021 - School of Rock

Year 10 Plays (October) -

 2008 - The Sting
 2009 - Billy Budd
 2010 - A Few Good Men
 2011 - Rusty Bugles
 2012 - Lord of the Flies
 2013 - Twelve Angry Men
 2014 - Alone it Stands
 2015 - Animal Farm
 2016 - Two Weeks With The Queen
 2017 - The 39 Steps
 2018 - Journey's End
 2019 - The Changing Room
 2020 - Chariots of Fire

Year 12 Plays (February) -

 2010 - Amadeus
 2011 - The Government Inspector
 2012 - The Imaginary Invalid
 2013 - Rumours
 2014 - Shakespeare in Hollywood
 2015 - Black Comedy
 2016 - And Then There Were None (play)
 2017 - The Bourgeois Gentleman
 2018 - Romanoff and Juliet
 2019 - Servant of Two Masters
 2020 - A Midsummer Night's Dream
 2021 - Rehearsal For Murder
 2022 - Cosi

Other - Notable Study Pieces:

 Dream
 latemail.com
 Così
 Treasure Island
 Man Alive
 The Importance of Being Earnest
 The Removalists
 Norm and Ahmed

Pastoral care
Pastoral care at Oakhill involves classroom based programs in Years 7 and 8 and a House system from Years 9–12. The Houses include:
 Benildus House — (Gold). Named after Saint Brother Bénilde Romançon (1805–1862); Feast Day: 13 August.
 La Salle House — (Red). Named after St. Jean-Baptiste de La Salle (1651–1719), the founder of the De La Salle Brothers; Feast Day: 15 May.
 Miguel House — (Purple). Named after St Brother Miguel Febres Cordero (1854–1910); Feast Day: 9 February.
 Mutien House — (Green). Named after St Brother Mutien-Marie Wiaux (1841–1917); Feast Day: 30 January.
 Solomon House — (Blue/Light Blue). Named after Blessed Brother Solomon LeClercq (1745–1792), martyr, France. Feast Day 2 September.
 Turon House — (Navy Blue). Named after Eight Brothers martyred 8 October 1934 in Turón, Spain. Feast Day 9 October.

Notable alumni

Academia, business, public service and politics
 Dominic Perrottet - 46th Premier of New South Wales (Finished studies at Redfield College Dural)
 Greg Whitby - Executive Director of Schools, Catholic Education Office

Media, entertainment and the arts
 Brian Castro, novelist and essayist (also attended St. Joseph's College, Hunters Hill)
 Dan Ilic, Comedian, broadcaster, filmmaker, host of Hungry Beast
 Steve Le Marquand, actor
 Tim Rogers, vocalist/guitarist and primary songwriter of Australian alternative rock band You Am I at the Sydney Theatre Company
 Ben Quilty, Australian painter
 Tara Rushton, Fox Sports Football TV Host, model and actress (KateModern)
 Doris Younane, actress (McLeod's Daughters)
 Ed Barnes, international touring folk punk singer-songwriter

Sport
 Lachlan Anderson, a professional rugby player and Rugby 7s Olympian
Katherine Bates, an Australian Olympic cyclist
 Grant Brits, an Olympic swimmer, bronze medallist in the 4 × 200 m freestyle relay at 2008 Beijing Olympics
 Bart Bunting, a dual Gold Medallist at 2002 Winter Paralympic Games, Salt Lake City, USA
 Catherine Cox, netball player and commentator 
 Nicholas Fitzgerald, a football player with the Melbourne City F.C.
 Harrison Goddard, an U20 Melbourne Rebels, U20 Wallabies
 Kieren Jack, an AFL player with the Sydney Swans
 Brandon Jack, an AFL player with the Sydney Swans
 Luke Keary, a professional rugby league footballer
 Jason Baitieri, a professional rugby league footballer 
 Julian Khazzouh, a NBL basketball player
 Andrew Ogilvy, a basketball player
Ryan Papenhuyzen , professional rugby league footballer
 Jordan Thompson, a professional tennis player
 Steven Ugarkovic, a football player with the Newcastle Jets
 Julia Wilson, an Olympic rower

See also

 List of Catholic schools in New South Wales
 Catholic education in Australia
 La Sallian educational institutions

References

External links
 Oakhill College Website

Roman Catholic Diocese of Parramatta
Catholic secondary schools in Sydney
Castle Hill, New South Wales
Educational institutions established in 1936
Independent Schools Association (Australia)
Hornsby Shire
1936 establishments in Australia
Lasallian schools in Australia